The Day Fire was a devastating wildfire that burned  of land in the Topatopa Mountains, within the Los Padres National Forest in Ventura County, southern California.

History
The fire, which was the largest of the 2006 California wildfire season, is the 17th largest fire in California history. The fire started on Labor Day September 4, 2006, and by October 1, had cost $70.3 million; at one point, the Day Fire had 4,600 active firefighters combating it.

The fire started on the Ojai Ranger District, in the congressionally designated Sespe Wilderness. The Sespe Wilderness is under the federal jurisdiction of the United States Forest Service. In addition to the land burned in the wilderness area,  of private land was burned in Lockwood Valley and the Mutau Flat area. A total of eleven structures were reported destroyed, including one residence and ten outbuildings.

Cause

The Day Fire was determined to be human caused Specifically, a debris burn consisting of clothing, ammunition, and other items were illegally ignited during fire restrictions. Ignited material coming out of the debris burn came in contact with surrounding dry grasses, causing a wildland fire to occur. On September 7, 2006, Steven Butcher walked out of the Day Fire with burns to his face. Mr. Butcher was the one who notified the authorities there was a fire burning in the Los Padres National Forest.

In 2009, Butcher was found guilty of starting the fire. "I hid up there for days afterward watching the animals running scared around me." Before sentencing, District Judge Valerie Baker Fairbank said that Butcher "clearly loved nature."

See also

References

Wildfires in Ventura County, California
2006 California wildfires
Los Padres National Forest
Topatopa Mountains